Christopher Duke Brown (born April 11, 1962) is a former American football defensive back in the National Football League. He played for the Pittsburgh Steelers in the 1984 and 1985 seasons.

References

1962 births
Living people
Sportspeople from Owensboro, Kentucky
Players of American football from Kentucky
Notre Dame Fighting Irish football players
Pittsburgh Steelers players